The 2003–04 Super 16 season was the 83rd season of the Super 16, the top level of ice hockey in France. 15 teams participated in the league, and Gothiques d'Amiens won their second league title.

First round

Western Group

Eastern Group

Second round

Final round

Playoffs

Relegation round

External links 
 Season on hockeyarchives.info

France
Elite
Ligue Magnus seasons